Water Sign may refer to:

 Water sign, a division of the astrological elements
 Water Sign (Jeff Lorber album), 1979
 Water Sign (Chris Rea album), 1983